

1830 Atlantic hurricane season
 A hurricane moved from Trinidad to western Cuba between August 3 and August 9.
 Twin Atlantic Coast Hurricanes of 1830. First noted in the Leeward Islands on August 11, a hurricane moved into the Caribbean in the middle of August. It moved west-northwestward, and approached the coast of Florida. It came close to present-day Daytona Beach on August 15, but recurved northeastward before landfall, although land was not spared from effects. It made landfall near Cape Fear North Carolina on the 16th and went out to sea that night, eventually well to the north of Bermuda just offshore the Canadian Maritimes. The hurricane broke a three-month drought, but caused heavy crop damage in the process.
 Twin Atlantic Coast Hurricanes of 1830. A hurricane tracked north of the Leeward Islands on August 19, impacting Cape Hatteras, North Carolina on August 24–25, and went up the coastline eventually striking Cape Cod, Massachusetts on August 26.
 A hurricane moved from north of Puerto Rico on September 29 to well northeast of Bermuda on October 1.
 A tropical storm struck South Carolina on October 6.

1831 Atlantic hurricane season
 A tropical storm made landfall in northeast Florida on June 10.
 A hurricane formed circa June 22 at an unusually low latitude and moved from south Barbados to the Yucatán Peninsula by June 28.
 The Great Barbados-Louisiana Hurricane of 1831 or The Great Caribbean Hurricane of 1831

On August 10–17, an intense Category 4 hurricane left cataclysmic damage across the Caribbean. After striking Barbados on 10 August, the hurricane damaged Saint Vincent (island), Saint Lucia, and Martinique. The hurricane destroyed Bridgetown (the capital of Barbados) and left 1500–2500 people dead who mostly drowned in the reported 17-foot storm surge or were crushed by collapsed buildings as the island was left desolate after the storm. The storm completely destroyed every sugar plantation on the island of St. Vincent, Saint Johns Parish church and the town of Les Cayes, Haiti, and damaged Santiago de Cuba. The storm traveled across the entire length of Cuba and damaged much of Guantanamo Bay in Cuba. The hurricane impacted South Florida and Key West between August 14 and August 15. The hurricane then drove into Louisiana near Last Island on 17 August as a category 3 hurricane. It left at least 2,500 people dead and $7 million (1831 dollars) in damage. One of the great hurricanes of the century. See List of deadliest Atlantic hurricanes.
The damage from this storm was also surveyed by British engineer William Reid and was instrumental in confirming William C. Redfield's (see 1821 Atlantic hurricane season) and John Farrar's (see 1819 Atlantic hurricane season) hypothesis that hurricanes are a spinning vortex of wind.
 A strong tropical storm or minimal hurricane struck western Louisiana between 27 and 30 August.
 A hurricane hit near the mouth of the Rio Bravo del Norte, causing heavy rain over Northern Mexico.

1832 Atlantic hurricane season
 A hurricane moved through the Bahamas around 5 June, causing 52 deaths. At Bermuda, the gale began from the northeast at 8 pm on 6 June, with the center likely passing quite close to the island as the wind shifted to southwest at 10:30 pm. The storm lasted until 3 a.m. on 7 June. Two schooners were damaged during the system.
 On August 7, a hurricane struck Jamaica.  On 12 August, Key West noted a tropical cyclone. The cyclone moved across the eastern Gulf of Mexico, striking northwest Florida. It then recurved through the American South, moving through South Carolina by August 18.
 On August 21, someone witnessed a tropical storm west-southwest of Cape Verde in the eastern tropical Atlantic.
 A hurricane on 23–27 August moved from the central Leeward Islands to the east of Jamaica.
 On October 14, a tropical storm moved into South Carolina.

1833 Atlantic hurricane season
 A hurricane passed offshore of Norfolk, Virginia, in late August, keeping ships at harbor but causing no damage.
 A hurricane impacted Louisiana between September 4 and 5.
 A hurricane impacted the entire east coast in early October reaching NY on October 13.

1834 Atlantic hurricane season
 The South Carolina Hurricane of 1834 On September 4 a hurricane hit South Carolina, causing 37 deaths. It moved through North Carolina and Virginia, capsizing the ship E Pluribus Unum. The crew made it safely to shore.
 A hurricane impacted Louisiana on September 6.
 The Padre Ruiz Hurricane of 1834 A hurricane struck the island of Dominica on September 20, bringing heavy winds and a  storm surge that devastated the capital of Roseau; 230 people are believed to have been killed by the hurricane's onslaught. Then the hurricane made its second landfall at Santo Domingo, Dominican Republic on the September 23. About 170 sailors died when their ships sank in the Ozama River. On land the hurricane disrupted the funeral service of Padre Ruiz, a Roman Catholic priest. A total of 400 people were killed from the hurricane. May have later impacted Louisiana on September 29.
 The Galveston Hurricane of 1834 Also in September, a hurricane hit Mexican Texas, causing heavy damage. This or another severe tropical cyclone visited Galveston.

1835 Atlantic hurricane season
 The Antigua-Gulf of Mexico-Rio Grande Hurricane of 1835 or Hurricane San Hipólito of 1835 A hurricane was first detected near Antigua on August 12. It crossed through Puerto Rico from southwest to north on August 13, damaging Fuerte de San José, and north of the Dominican Republic, and Cuba, causing at least 3 casualties. It moved across the Florida Straits and the Gulf of Mexico, hitting near the mouth of the Rio Grande on August 18. There, it destroyed small villages, caused strong storm surge, and killed 18 people.
 Between September 12 to the 15th a hurricane smashed Cape Florida and Key Biscayne, creating the Norris Cut and knocking over the Ponce de Leon lighthouse. From there, the storm entered the Gulf of Mexico and took a hard northeast tack, damaging Fort Brooke in Tampa, then moving northward into Georgia and the Carolinas, making the trip "all the way into New England."
 The South Florida or Key West Hurricane of 1835  First detected in the vicinity of Jamaica on the 12th and crossed central Cuba on the 14th. Hurricane struck Key West area on the 14th and 15th. First good account of hurricane activity near Key West island as the island was sparsely populated before 1830 (only becoming claimed for the United States in 1821). Account published in the Key West Inquirer which had only been in publication for a year at that point. Lightship Florida at Carysfort was severely damaged.

1836 Atlantic hurricane season
 A hurricane swept through Woodstock, New Brunswick on July 27, 1836. Likely a Category 1.
 A hurricane struck eastern North Carolina between October 10 and 11 doing great damage.

1837 Atlantic hurricane season
Lt. Col. William Red of the Royal Engineers was able to map eleven storms during the 1837 season in his book "Law of Storms" published in 1838.

 On July 9 and 10, a tropical storm impacted Barbados.
 On July 26, a storm hit Martinique and Barbados. As a hurricane, the system moved ashore in southern Florida and then through the northeast Gulf of Mexico into Alabama by August 5.  It caused 57 deaths.
 The Antigua-Florida Hurricane of 1837 or Hurricane Nuestra Señora de Los Angeles of 1837. A hurricane passed by Antigua on August 1. The storm then entered Humacao, Puerto Rico, around 5–6 pm 2 August, and left the island through Vega Baja, Puerto Rico, and Dorado, Puerto Rico, ten to twelve hours later (3–6 am 3 August). The eye passed very near San Juan, Puerto Rico, where the barometric pressure (available for the first time in Puerto Rico) registered . The hurricane sunk all ships in the Bay of San Juan. The worst damages occurred in the northeastern part of the island.  Thereafter, the tropical cyclone moved northwest to the Florida/Georgia border before recurving through the western Carolinas on August 7.
 The Calypso Hurricane A tropical system was observed east of the West Indies on August 13. It moved through the islands and passed the Bahamas on August 16. While recurving, it hit the North Carolina coast on August 18. It slowly moved over land, causing 48 hours of strong winds, and moved back offshore into the Atlantic on 20 August, bypassing southern New England by August 22.
 A tropical storm moved east of Bermuda on 21–25 August 21.
 The Apalachee Bay Storm A hurricane moved east-northeast from the Gulf of Mexico on 31 August, struck Apalachee Bay, and moved just offshore the Carolinas by 2 September.
 The Bahamas Hurricane of 1837 A tropical storm formed near the northern Bahamas on 13 September. It moved northeast through the western Atlantic Ocean on 15 September.
 A tropical storm moved across Saint Augustine, Florida, affecting northeast Florida between September 24 and the 26th.
 A hurricane was noted near Bermuda on October 1 to 3.
 Racer's hurricane
 
 This hurricane caused 105 deaths on a 2,000 mile track from the Caribbean to Texas to North Carolina. Racer's storm named for a British warship which encountered the storm in the northwest Caribbean, was one of the most destructive storms of the 19th century. The British ship Racer survived the hurricane and went into Havana for repairs and provided valuable information on hurricanes to William Reid.
 Racer's storm started as a tropical storm moved across the western Caribbean Sea in late September. It first formed near Jamaica on 26–27 September., moved across the Yucatán Peninsula, and struck the western Gulf of Mexico where it struck near Brownsville, Texas on October 2. It stalled near the coast for three days and then recurved to the east hitting Galveston, Texas, Louisiana, Mississippi, Alabama, Georgia, Pensacola, Florida, and South and North Carolina. It ultimately moved into the Atlantic Ocean on October 11. The hurricane caused destruction all over the Gulf of Mexico including destroying the Mexican Navy and several U.S. ships. During the storm, a paddle boat named Home headed to Charleston ran into the hurricane off of Cape Hatteras. The boat sank with 90 people on board with only 40 surviving and there were only two life preservers on board the boat. As a result of this sinking, U.S. Congress passed a law from this storm mandating the every vessel in the future must have at least enough life preservers for every passenger on board.
 A tropical storm crossed central Cuba on October 26, moving north-northeast offshore the coast of the Southeast United States through October 29.

1838 Atlantic hurricane season
 On September 7, a hurricane hit near Cape Florida, causing 38 deaths.
 Two hurricanes hit Cayman Islands in this season or in the previous season on September 28 and October 25.
 A late season hurricane hit the east coast of Mexico on November 1, sinking two U.S. ships.

1839 Atlantic hurricane season

 The Atlantic Coast Hurricane of 1839. A hurricane hit Charleston, South Carolina on August 28. It passed over North Carolina and Virginia before going out to sea on the 30th.
 Reid's Hurricane. The system moved from east of the West Indies into the southwest Atlantic. Swells were noted as early as September 9 at Bermuda. During late on the September 11 and early on September 12, this hurricane struck Bermuda. Thousands of trees were downed. The tower on Tower Hill was levelled. Damage done to private property totalled 8000 pounds sterling (1839 pounds). This was one of the first hurricanes to be studied by William Reid in person, in this case as governor of the island the year after his publication of "The Law of Storms" (from Beware the Hurricane).
 During the middle of September, a hurricane approached the coast of Louisiana. It struck near Lake Charles, then known as Charley's Lake, on September 15.
 A late season hurricane hit Galveston, Texas on November 5.

See also 

 Atlantic hurricane season
 List of tropical cyclones

References

Further reading
 David Longshore. "Padre Ruiz Hurricane." Encyclopedia of Hurricanes, Typhoons and Cyclones. David Longshore. New York: Facts on File, 1998, Pg; 257.
 David Longshore. "Great Caribbean Hurricane of 1831." Encyclopedia of Hurricanes, Typhoons and Cyclones. David Longshore. New York: Facts on File, 1998, Pg; 145.
 Terry Tucker. Beware the Hurricane! The Story of the Gyratory Tropical Storms That Have Struck Bermuda. Bermuda: Hamilton Press, 1966, p. 89–104.

External links
 http://www.nhc.noaa.gov/pastdeadly.shtml 
 http://www.wpc.ncep.noaa.gov/research/roth/vahur.htm
 http://www.wpc.ncep.noaa.gov/research/txhur.pdf
 http://www.wpc.ncep.noaa.gov/research/lahur.pdf
 https://web.archive.org/web/20050828220614/http://www.eglin.af.mil/weather/hurricanes/history.html
 https://web.archive.org/web/20050917005033/http://www.sun-sentinel.com/news/weather/hurricane/sfl-hc-canehistory1,0,3352010.special

 
1830s